Dêrong County is a county in the west of Sichuan Province, China, bordering Yunnan province to the west. It is under the administration of the Garzê Tibetan Autonomous Prefecture.

Climate

References

Populated places in the Garzê Tibetan Autonomous Prefecture
County-level divisions of Sichuan